The EFL Championship Player of the Month is an association football award that recognises the player adjudged the best for each month of the season in the EFL Championship, the second tier of English football. Originally named the Football League Championship Player of the Month award, it replaced the First Division Player of the Month as the Championship replaced the Second Division in 2004, and in 2016, when the Football League rebranded itself as the English Football League (EFL), the award was renamed accordingly. For sponsorship reasons, since its inception it has been known as the Coca-Cola Player of the Month award; Coca-Cola sponsored the Football League since 2004 and the deal ended 2010. From the 2010–11 to the 2012–13 season, the Football League was sponsored by NPower, so it was known as the NPower Player of the Month award. As of the 2013–14 season, the league has been sponsored by Skybet, so it is now the SkyBet Player of the Month award. The awards are designed and manufactured in the UK by bespoke awards company Gaudio Awards.

List of winners

 Each year in the table below is linked to the corresponding football season.

Multiple winners
Up to and including the November 2022 award.

 The table lists all the players who have won more than once.

Awards won by nationality
Up to and including the February 2023 award.

Awards won by club
Up to and including the February 2023 award.

See also
Premier League Player of the Month
EFL Championship Manager of the Month
EFL League One Player of the Month
EFL League Two Player of the Month

References

Association football player of the month awards
Player of the Month
English Football League trophies and awards